Mad Men is an American period drama television series created by Matthew Weiner, produced by Lionsgate Television and broadcast on the cable network AMC. It premiered on July 19, 2007, and ended on May 17, 2015, after seven seasons and ninety-two episodes. Set in New York City amid the social changes of the 1960s, the show follows the people working at an advertising agency on Madison Avenue. It stars Jon Hamm as Don Draper, an advertising executive at the fictional Sterling Cooper agency (later Sterling Cooper Draper Pryce) who, despite his professional successes, struggles to handle secrets from his past and to maintain his personal and family life. Other members of the show's original ensemble cast include Elisabeth Moss as Peggy Olson, Vincent Kartheiser as Pete Campbell, January Jones as Betty Draper, Christina Hendricks as Joan Holloway, and John Slattery as Roger Sterling; the cast saw numerous changes during its run.

Mad Men has been widely praised as one of the greatest television series of its era and of all time, and during its run, it earned numerous accolades for its acting, writing, directing, and technical achievements. Among these recognitions, it won sixteen Primetime Emmy Awards from 116 nominations. The series won the award for Outstanding Drama Series four times from eight nominations, tying the record for most wins in the category. Its win in 2008 for its first season made it the first basic cable series to win the award. Hamm was also nominated eight times for Outstanding Lead Actor in a Drama Series, ultimately winning the award once in 2015. However, despite these successes, the show often came up notably empty-handed; its seventeen nominations without a win in 2012 set an Emmys record for largest shutout in a year, and Hamm's win in 2015 was the show's only acting win from thirty-seven nominations.

Other accolades for Mad Men include five Golden Globe Awards from thirteen nominations. Its three wins for Best Television Series – Drama are tied for the record for most wins in the category. The show won the Television Critics Association Award for Program of the Year in 2008, in addition to three wins for Outstanding Achievement in Drama and two wins for Individual Achievement in Drama for Hamm. In 2011, it won the inaugural Critics' Choice Television Award for Best Drama Series. The series also won seven Writers Guild of America Awards – including four wins for Dramatic Series and two wins for Episodic Drama – two Directors Guild of America Awards, and three Producers Guild of America Awards. It won two Screen Actors Guild Awards, both for Outstanding Performance by an Ensemble in a Drama Series. In 2008, the series received a Peabody Award, recognizing it as one of the best productions in electronic media.

Awards and nominations

Notes

Nominees for awards

Other

References

External links 
 

Awards and nominations
Mad Men